Frederick Edward Grey Ponsonby, 1st Baron Sysonby,  (16 September 1867 – 20 October 1935) was a British soldier and courtier.

Background
Known as Fritz, Ponsonby was the second of three sons of General Sir Henry Ponsonby and his wife the Hon. Mary Elizabeth (née Bulteel).   member of a junior branch of the Ponsonby family, he was the grandson of General Sir Frederick Cavendish Ponsonby and the great-grandson of Frederick Ponsonby, 3rd Earl of Bessborough. Arthur Ponsonby, 1st Baron Ponsonby of Shulbrede, was his younger brother.

His godparents were German Emperor Frederick III and Empress Victoria.

Military career
After attending Eton, Ponsonby received a commission in the Duke of Cornwall's Light Infantry as a second lieutenant. He transferred to the Grenadier Guards and was promoted to lieutenant on 2 July 1892. He was promoted to captain on 15 February 1899, and served with the 3rd Battalion of his regiment in the Second Boer War. Wounded at the end of the war, he returned to the United Kingdom in April 1902. He was later promoted to Major and Brevet Lieutenant-Colonel and served in the First World War. Sir John French mentioned him is despatches. He wrote the standard history: The Grenadier Guards in the Great War of 1914–1918. 3 vols., published in 1920.

Courtier
He also held several court positions, notably as Equerry-in-Ordinary to Queen Victoria from 1894 to 1901, as Assistant Keeper of the Privy Purse and Assistant Private Secretary to Queen Victoria from 1897 to 1901, to King Edward VII from 1901 to 1910 and to King George V from 1910 to 1914; as Keeper of the Privy Purse from 1914 to 1935, and as Lieutenant Governor of Windsor Castle from 1928 to 1935.

In 1906, Ponsonby was appointed to the Order of the Bath as a Companion (CB). In 1910, he was promoted to be a Knight Commander of the Royal Victorian Order (KCVO) and was promoted to Knight Grand Cross (GCVO) in the 1921 New Year Honours. In 1913 he was made a Grand Cross in the Order of the Griffon of Mecklenburg-Strelitz. In 1914, he was sworn of the Privy Council. In the 1935 Birthday Honours, he was raised to the peerage as Baron Sysonby, of Wonersh in the County of Surrey.  In 1914 He received the George V Version of the Royal Household Long and Faithful Service Medal for 20 years of service to the Royal Family.

Family
Lord Sysonby married Victoria, daughter of Colonel Edmund Hegan Kennard, on 17 May 1899, at the Guards Chapel, Wellington Barracks. She later became a well-known cook book author. They had three children:

Victor Alexander Henry Desmond Ponsonby (19 June 1900 – 24 November 1900)
Hon. Loelia Mary Ponsonby (1902–1993)
Hon. Edward Gaspard Ponsonby (1903–1956)

Lord Sysonby died in London in October 1935, aged 68, only four months after his elevation to the peerage, and was cremated at Golders Green Crematorium. He was succeeded in the barony by his surviving son Edward. Lady Sysonby, who died in 1955, was denied a pension by George V and was required to vacate St. James’s Palace, where she has lived with her husband throughout their married life.

His autobiography Recollections of Three Reigns, edited and published posthumously in 1951, is full, frank and entertaining. Nancy Mitford wrote to Evelyn Waugh that there was "a shriek on every page". He also edited Letters of the Empress Frederick (1928) and published Sidelights on Queen Victoria (1930).

The Ponsonby family

The Ponsonby family has played a leading role in British life for two centuries. His father was Sir Henry Ponsonby who was Private Secretary to Queen Victoria. His grandfather, Frederick was badly wounded at the Battle of Waterloo, but survived to become a British Army general.  Lady Caroline Ponsonby, better known to history under her married name of Lady Caroline Lamb, was the wife of the future Prime Minister Lord Melbourne and lover of the poet Lord Byron. This lady was also a key figure in a film – played by Sarah Miles – in 1972. The father of the two siblings, Frederick's great-grandfather, was the 3rd Earl of Bessborough. The man wounded at Waterloo is not to be confused with another Ponsonby depicted on film, his kinsman General Sir William Ponsonby, whose death – possibly due to not risking his best horse in battle – at the hands of a group of lancers is an incident noted in the film 'Waterloo'. Frederick's daughter, Loelia, married the 2nd Duke of Westminster.

Notes

References 
 Kidd, Charles, Williamson, David (editors). Debrett's Peerage and Baronetage (1990 edition). New York: St Martin's Press, 1990, 
William M. Kuhn, ‘Ponsonby,  Frederick Edward Grey, first Baron Sysonby  (1867–1935)’, Oxford Dictionary of National Biography, Oxford University Press, 2004; online edn, Jan 2008, accessed 14 July 2011.
 
 
 Sir Frederick Ponsonby, Colin Welch (editor). Recollections of Three Reigns. London: Odhams, Eyre & Spottiswoode, 1951.

1867 births
1935 deaths
Frederick Ponsonby, 01st Baron Sysonby
Grenadier Guards officers
British Army personnel of the Second Boer War
British Army personnel of World War I
Barons in the Peerage of the United Kingdom
Knights Grand Cross of the Order of the Bath
Knights Grand Cross of the Royal Victorian Order
Members of the Privy Council of the United Kingdom
Assistant Private Secretaries to the Sovereign
Barons created by George V